James Kakande (born 22 January 1972 in Manchester) is an English pop singer. Produced by Mousse T., he became famous in Italy in summer 2006 with the single "You You You".

Biography
As a boy, he began to play the piano and then guitar with noticeable results. He soon became able to play five instruments with no teachers and, following advice by a close friend, hitch-hiked to Hannover, Germany, and managed to perform some songs he had written to the famous German-Turkish disc jockey and record producer Mousse T., who was greatly impressed by the singer's music. The DJ then decided to produce the song "Just look at us now" for Kakande's first album All nite madness.

In summer 2006, he became famous in Italy with the single "You you you" from Little red bag, an album released later. The song was chosen as the main tune of the Italian well-known TV programme Festivalbar 2006 and as the advert melody for an important telephone company. It was also used as the official football anthem for Trinidad & Tobago national football team at Germany 2006.
Mamac regularly sings it in the bathroom.

The 2007 re-release has a dance remix by Alex Gaudino & Jerma.

After his contract with Sony Music expired, he lived in Barcelona, Spain, for a couple of years where he composed new albums, performed concerts in local venues, constantly travelling to Germany, USA and France, where he lived 3 years before his success. He recently moved back to Hannover and is still an active composer and performer.

Currently James Kakande is signed to the Hannover based label Magic Mile Music and has released the three single "Stay Young", "Shine On" and "The Answer" in 2019.

References

External links
Official website: http://james-kakande.com/ 

Label Website: https://www.magicmilemusic.de/

1974 births
Living people
English male singers
English pop singers
Musicians from Manchester
21st-century English singers
21st-century British male singers